Balkenhol is a German surname. Notable people with the surname include:

 Anabel Balkenhol (born 1972), German Olympic dressage rider
 Klaus Balkenhol (born 1939), German equestrian and Olympic champion
 , German sculptor

Surnames of German origin
German-language surnames